Marta Sanz-Solé  (born 19 January 1952 in Sabadell, Barcelona) is a Catalan mathematician specializing in probability theory. 
She obtained her PhD in 1978 from the University of Barcelona under the supervision of David Nualart.

Career
Sanz-Solé is professor at the University of Barcelona, and head of the research group on stochastic processes. Prior to taking up her post at the UB, she was associate professor at the University Autònoma of Barcelona. She was Dean of the Faculty of Mathematics UB from 1993-1996, and Vice-president of the Division of Experimental Sciences and Mathematics from 2000-2003. In May 2015 she was appointed chair of the scientific Committee of the Graduate School of Mathematics (BGSMath). and from May 2018 until October 2019, she held the position of Director.

Research
Her research interests are in stochastic analysis, in particular stochastic differential and partial differential equations. She has published more than 100 scientific articles according to MathSciNet and zbMath Open.
and a monograph on Malliavin calculus and applications to SPDEs.

Service
Sanz-Solé served in the executive committee of the European Mathematical Society in 1997-2004. She was elected president in 2010, and held the post from January 2011 to December 2014. She is or has been member of several international committees overseeing the mathematical sciences. In particular, the Board of Directors of the Institut Henri Poincaré, the FSMP (Fondation Sciences Mathématiques de Paris), the committee for research and education of the École Polytechnique, and the Scientific Committee of CIRM (Centre des Rencontres Mathématiques, Luminy, France). In the past years, she served in the Scientific Council of the  Banach Center  (2010-2014), the Fellows Committee of the Institute of Mathematical Statistics (2012-2014), and the Committee of Special Lectures (2008-2010). She was a member of the Board of Directors of the Centre de Recerca Matemàtica (Bellaterra, Barcelona) for a three-year period, starting April 2007.  
On the list of her editorial service there is the membership of the editorial board of the Annals of Probability 

from 2015 to 2020.
In June 2015, she was appointed member of the Abel Committee for the Abel Prize 2016, 2017.
She served at the ERC  Consolidator Grant panel PE1 in 2015, 2017, 2019 and 2021, and was the chair in the last two calls.

Recognition
In 1998 she was awarded with Narcis Monturiol Medal of Scientific and Technological Excellence  by the  Generalitat of Catalonia. In 2011 she was elected Fellow of the Institute of Mathematical Statistics.  In november 2016, she was elected numerary member of the Institute of Catalan Studies. In 2017 she was awarded the Real Sociedad Matemática Española Medal  for her scientific contributions and relevant international positions and service. The same year, she was elected honorary fellow of the Catalan College of Economists
.  In January 2019, she became numerary member of the Royal Academy of Sciences and Arts of Barcelona.
On the occasion of her 70th birthday, she was honoured with the conference Stochastic Analysis and Stochastic Partial Differential Equations,  
 held at the 
Centre de Recerca Matemàtica in June 2022.

References

External links
 Marta Sanz-Solé home page at University of Barcelona  
 The European Mathematical Society
 Marta Sanz-Solé's Author Profile on MathSciNet
 Marta Sanz-Solé's Author Profile on zbMath Open

20th-century Spanish  mathematicians
21st-century Spanish  mathematicians
Fellows of the Institute of Mathematical Statistics
1952 births
Living people
20th-century women mathematicians
21st-century women mathematicians
Presidents of the European Mathematical Society
Academic staff of the University of Barcelona